The 1960 Vermont Catamounts football team was an American football team that represented  the University of Vermont in the Yankee Conference during the 1960 NCAA College Division football season. In their ninth year under head coach J. Edward Donnelly, the team compiled a 1–6 record.

Schedule

References

Vermont
Vermont Catamounts football seasons
Vermont Catamounts football